Jeju Jwa clan was one of the Korean clans. Their Bon-gwan was in Jeju Province. According to the research in 2000, the number of Jeju Jwa clan was 3,130. The name of Jwa clan came from Zuo Qiuming who was a politician in Lu, China. Jeju Jwa clan’s founder was  who was a Cheongwansirang in Yuan dynasty. He took his post as government official when Yuan dynasty ruled Goryeo.

See also 
 Korean clan names of foreign origin

References

External links 
 

 
Korean clan names of Chinese origin